Kitalya Maximum Security Prison is a maximum security prison for both men and women in Uganda.

Location
The coordinates of Kitalya Maximum Security Prison are 0°26'13.0"N, 32°13'36.0"E (Latitude:0.436944; Longitude:32.226667).

Overview
Ambitious Construction Company Limited was awarded the construction contract, at a price of Sh18.3 billion (approx. US$5.5 million in July 2016). The new prison is intended to relieve Luzira Maximum Security Prison, which is congested. Construction is expected to conclude in 2018.

Physical construction was concluded in February 2020. However, before the facility receives its first inmate, the senor staff who are going to operate the prison, including Onesmus Bitaliwo, the designated Officer in Charge, are expected to tour similar facilities abroad, to learn first-hand how such facilities are run.

The facility also needs to be equipped with furniture, bedding and security equipment, including closed-circuit television (CCTV) cameras and monitoring equipment. Kitalya is reported to have more than six layers of security, physical, electronic and otherwise.

Facilities
The new prison has common dormitory wards, 30 individual cells, a medical wing with inpatient facilities. It also has a kitchen equipped with energy-saving technology. Other amenities include a  contact visitors' room and isolation rooms for contagious diseases. It has an array of recreational facilities, including a soccer field, a basketball court, a volleyball court, and a tennis court.

See also
 African Prisons Project
 Luzira Maximum Security Prison
 JLOS House Project

References

External links
Website of Uganda Prisons Service
10,000 survive prison, sentenced to community service As of 18 February 2019.

Prisons in Uganda
Wakiso District
Buildings and structures in Uganda
Buildings and structures completed in 2020
2020 establishments in Uganda